Bernd Buchheister (born 21 September 1962) is a retired German football player. He played seven seasons in the 2. Bundesliga with Eintracht Braunschweig. With 78 goals in all competitions he remains one of the club's most prolific goalscorers in history.

References

External links
 

1962 births
Living people
German footballers
Eintracht Braunschweig players
Association football forwards
Sportspeople from Braunschweig
2. Bundesliga players
Footballers from Lower Saxony